Sylvan (or Silvian, or Silvan), was launched on the River Tyne in 1800. She traded with the Baltic and North America. In 1827 she ran down and sank a coaster. In the 1830s she carried immigrants to Canada. She herself was wrecked on 29 March 1834.

Career
Sylvan first appeared in Lloyd's Register in 1800.

On 22 December 1824 a gale drove Sylvan ashore between Hartlepool and Sunderland.

Sinking of Queen Charlotte: On 27 October 1827 the smack , Nicholson, master, was sailing from Leith to London with passengers and cargo when Silvia/Sylvan, of Shields, ran into her off Lowestoffe and cut her in half. Nicholson barely had time to get his crew and passengers aboard Silvia before Queen Charlotte sank without a trace.

On 23 July 1831 Silvan, Gilham, master, delivered 62 settlers from Yarmouth to Quebec.  

On 4 June 1832 Sylvan, Gilham, master, arrived at Quebec with 16 immigrants that she had brought from Yarmouth. She had sailed on 12 April.

Fate
Sylvan, Stephenson, master, of North Shields, was wrecked on 29 March 1834 in the Kattegat. She was carrying coals, grindstones, coal tar, etc. from Newcastle upon Tyne to Wismar. A heavy gale had driven her ashore on an island. At daylight some fishermen discovered her and succeeded in getting a rope from her mast to the shore. Shortly after her crew were hauled ashore she went to pieces.

Citations

1800 ships
Ships built on the River Tyne
Age of Sail merchant ships of England
Maritime incidents in December 1824
Maritime incidents in October 1827
Maritime incidents in March 1834